Michael Breilmann (born 10 October 1983) is a German lawyer and politician of the Christian Democratic Union (CDU) who has been serving as a member of the Bundestag since 2021.

Early life and education
Breilmann was born 1983 in the West German city of Herne.

Political career
Breilmann was elected to the Bundestag in the 2021 elections, representing the Recklinghausen I district. 

In parliament, Breilmann has since been serving on the Committee on Internal Affairs and Community and the Committee on Housing, Urban Development, Building and Local Government. He is his parliamentary group's spokesperson for political extremism and antisemitism.

Other activities
 Federal Agency for Civic Education (BPB), Member of the Board of Trustees (since 2022)

References 

Living people
1983 births
Christian Democratic Union of Germany politicians
Members of the Bundestag 2021–2025
21st-century German politicians